Robinsichthys arrowsmithensis is a species of goby found on the Arrowsmith Bank in the Caribbean Sea at depths of from .  This species grows to a length of  SL.  This species is the only known member of its genus. The name of this genus honours C. Richard Robins (1928-2020), an American ichthyologist who was an important contributor to the study of gobies of the Americas.

References

Gobiidae
Monotypic fish genera
Fish described in 1988